Hieracium paniculatum, the Allegheny hawkweed, is a North American plant species in the tribe Cichorieae within the family Asteraceae. It grows only in the eastern United States and eastern Canada, from Nova Scotia west to Ontario, Michigan, and Indiana south as far as Georgia.

One stalk can sometimes produce as many as 50 flower heads in a flat-topped array. Each head has 8-30 yellow ray flowers but no disc flowers.

References

paniculatum
Flora of the Western United States
Plants described in 1753
Taxa named by Carl Linnaeus
Flora without expected TNC conservation status